North Hill Centre is a shopping mall in Calgary, Alberta, Canada. It opened in 1958, and was Calgary's first shopping mall.  The original anchor tenant was Simpsons-Sears (later Sears Canada), but it closed on January 8, 2018.

History

Opening

Stores in the mall began opening in June 1958, and the mall's official grand opening was in October 1958. It was billed as the largest shopping centre in Western Canada, with about 30 stores and services. As described by mall spokeswoman Paula Newhold: "It was revolutionary to have a mall and to have late-night shopping and all of that kind of stuff that is just quite normal for us now. The real experience was that it was all in one place - that was the interesting thing."

1973 expansion

North Hill Centre was originally built as a strip mall accompanied by a freestanding Simpson-Sears department store. In 1973 the mall underwent a major renovation, which added 20 more stores and enclosed the shopping area. The design featured a central corridor with irregularly sized columns and ceiling heights, presenting an inconsistent look to the storefronts in the mall.

By the 1990s, anchor tenants for the mall were Sears and Canada Safeway (on the east end), along with Super Valu (on the west end), giving the mall two major grocery stores.

The North Hill Theatre and Fairview Bowling Alley, erected in the parking lot in 1967, remained in operation until 1999.

2000 renovations
In 2000, the mall was renovated. The interior columns were removed, the mall ceiling was raised to a consistent height, and additional shops and services were added. A new food court was developed, and the Canada Safeway, previously located at the east end of the mall next to Sears, was relocated to the west end, replacing the by-now-defunct SuperValu grocery store and becoming the mall's west anchor. The renovations also involved demolishing the standalone movie theatre/bowling alley on the mall's north side to make room for more parking and building footprint expansion.

The mall's Sears Canada location closed, along with the rest of the chain, in early 2018. As of early 2020, a furniture store was operating out of the ground-floor level of the former Sears. In 2018-19 the mall added two junior anchor store tenants: Dollarama and Winners.

Sears Plume

In the early 90s, a gas station located in the parking lot and operated by Sears Canada was found to have been leaking into the soil, poisoning the groundwater. The leak occurred for at least two decades, leading to a large underground collection of gasoline. Because of this, it was necessary to create several monitoring sites in the nearby neighbourhood of Hounsfield Heights/Briar Hill. The monitoring sites consist of multiple wells and three meters installed in residential homes.

References

Shopping malls in Calgary
Shopping malls established in 1958